Cagliari Calcio only just managed to stay up in Serie A, with key player David Suazo scoring 14 goals, to help clinching the survival. Finishing a point above Chievo in the relegation zone, Cagliari both dismissed and reappointed Marco Giampaolo over the course of the season, following a brief stint from Franco Colomba.

Serie A

Squad

Goalkeepers
  Simone Aresti
  Antonio Chimenti
  Marco Fortin

Defenders
  Michele Canini
  Diego López
  Cristiano Del Grosso
  Francesco Pisano
  José Semedo
  Paolo Bianco
  Joe Bizera
  Michele Ferri
  Alessandro Agostini

Midfielders
  Simone Pepe
  Davide Marchini
  Daniele Conti
  Alessandro Budel
  Alessandro Conticchio
  Leonardo Colucci
  Antonino D'Agostino
  Salvatore Burrai
  Gabriel Peñalba

Attackers
  Mauro Esposito
  David Suazo
  Andrea Capone
  Andrea Cocco
  Antonio Langella

Sources
 RSSSF - Italy Championship 2006/07

Cagliari Calcio seasons
Cagliari